Ann Fienup-Riordan (born 1948) is an American cultural anthropologist known for her work with the Yup'ik of western Alaska, particularly on Nelson Island and the Yukon–Kuskokwim Delta. She lives in Anchorage, Alaska.

She received her Ph.D. in anthropology in 1980 from the University of Chicago, where she was influenced by David M. Schneider.  Her dissertation was based on 1976-77 fieldwork on Nelson Island, Alaska.

Awards
 Historian of the Year, Alaska Historical Society, 1991, 2001
 Distinguished Humanities Educator (Alaska), 2001
 Denali Award, 2000, Alaska Federation of Natives, for the greatest contribution by a non-Native

Works
 Fienup-Riordan, Ann. (1983). The Nelson Island Eskimo: Social Structure and Ritual Distribution. Anchorage, AK: Alaska Pacific University Press.
 Fienup-Riordan, Ann. (1986). When Our Bad Season Comes: A Cultural Account of Subsistence Harvesting & Harvest Disruption on the Yukon Delta. Alaska Anthropological Assn.
 Ann Fienup-Riordan (ed.) The Yup’ik Eskimo as Described in the Travel Journals and Ethnographic Accounts of John and Edith Kilbuck, 1885–1900. 1988. The Limestone Press, Kingston, Ontario
 Fienup-Riordan, Ann. (1990). Eskimo Essays: Yup'ik Lives and How We See Them. New Brunswick, NJ: Rutgers University Press.
 Fienup-Riordan, Ann. (1991). The Real People and the Children of Thunder: The Yup'ik Eskimo Encounter With Moravian Missionaries John and Edith Kilbuck. Norman, OK: University of Oklahoma Press.
 Fienup-Riordan, Ann. (1994). Boundaries and Passages: Rule and Ritual in Yup'ik Eskimo Oral Tradition. Norman, OK: University of Oklahoma Press.
 Fienup-Riordan, Ann. (1995). Freeze Frame: Alaska Eskimos in the Movies. Seattle, WA: University of Washington Press.
 Fienup-Riordan, Ann. (1996). The Living Tradition of Yup'ik Masks: Agayuliyararput (Our Way of Making Prayer). Seattle, WA: University of Washington Press.
 Fienup-Riordan, Ann. (2000). Hunting Tradition in a Changing World: Yup'ik Lives in Alaska Today. New Brunswick, NJ: Rutgers University Press.
 Fienup-Riordan, Ann. (2000). Where the Echo Began: and Other Oral Traditions from Southwestern Alaska Recorded by Hans Himmelheber Ed. Anchorage, AK: University of Alaska Press.
 Fienup-Riordan, Ann. (2001). What's in a Name? Becoming a Real Person in a Yup'ik Community. University of Nebraska Press.
 Fienup-Riordan, Ann; Rearden, Alice. (2005). Wise Words of the Yup'ik People: We Talk to You because We Love You. University of Nebraska Press.
 Fienup-Riordan, Ann; Meade, Marie; Rearden, Alice. (2005). Yup'ik Words of Wisdom: Yupiit Qanruyutait. University of Nebraska Press.
 Fienup-Riordan, Ann; Jimmie, Fredda; Rearden, Alice. (2007). Yuungnaqpiallerput/The Way We Genuinely Live: Masterworks of Yup'ik Science and Survival. University of Washington Press.
 Fienup-Riordan, Ann; Kaplan, Lawrence. (2007). Words of the Real People: Alaska Native Literature in Translation. University of Chicago Press.
 Fienup-Riordan, Ann. (2020). "Nunakun-gguq Ciutengqertut/They Say They Have Ears Through the Ground. Animal Essays from Southwest Alaska". University of Alaska Press.

ExhibitionsAgayuliyararput (Our Way of Making Prayer): The Living Tradition of Yup'ik Masks. The exhibit opened in 1996 in Toksook Bay and at the Yupiit Piciryarait Museum in Bethel, and then moved to the Anchorage Museum of History and Art, Anchorage. It also traveled to the University of Alaska Museum, Fairbanks, and Alaska State Museum, Juneau, the National Museum of the American Indian, New York, Smithsonian's National Museum of Natural History, Washington, D.C., and ending at the Seattle (Wash.) Art Museum in 1998. 
 Yuungnaqpiallerput (The Way We Genuinely Live): Masterworks of Yupik Science and Survival''. The exhibition opened in 2007 at the Yupiit Piciryarait Museum, Bethel, and then at the Anchorage Museum. From 2008 to 2010 the exhibition traveled to museums in Fairbanks and Juneau, Alaska, and Washington, DC.

References

1948 births
American anthropologists
American women anthropologists
American anthropology writers
Living people
Writers from Anchorage, Alaska
University of Chicago alumni
University of Michigan alumni
Yupik
American Book Award winners
21st-century American women
Eskimologists